Blue Obsession is the fifth studio album by American singer-songwriter Michael McDonald. The album was released on March 28, 2000, by Ramp Records. The original album was pulled from release before it got to stores, but a few advance copies did get out.  The original has a different track listing and 3 songs from it were removed and replaced by other songs.  A cover of "Tell It Like It Is" was pulled and still has never been officially released.  Catalog # 2-46508 was the promo on the Reprise label, not Ramp.

Track listing

Personnel 

 Michael McDonald – lead vocals, rhythm arrangements (2, 3, 6, 8, 10), synthesizers (2, 4, 8, 10), vocal arrangements (2), organ (3, 7, 9), acoustic piano (4, 5, 11, 12), clavinet (5), backing vocals (11)
 Tommy Sims – rhythm arrangements (1, 2, 6, 7, 8), keyboards (1, 6, 8), bass (1, 2, 3, 6, 7, 8, 10), vocal arrangements (1, 2), horn arrangements (1, 2, 7), duet vocals (1), clavinet (2), rhythm guitar (2), drum programming (6), guitar (6, 7), synthesizers (7), percussion (8), acoustic piano (8, 10)
 Marc Harris – organ (1, 4–7, 12), clavinet (5)
 Billy Livsey – organ (2, 10)
 Johnny Neel – Hammond B3 organ (3)
 David Pack – additional keyboards (11), guitar (11)
 Joe Houge – programming (11), organ (11), sampling (11)
 Chris Rodriguez – guitar (1, 11), acoustic guitar (12)
 Bernie Chiaravalle – rhythm guitar (2), guitar solo (2), guitar (3, 4, 5, 10), cymbal (4)
 George Cocchini – acoustic guitar (3), guitar (8)
 Will Owsley – electric guitar (3)
 Gordon Kennedy – acoustic guitar (6, 10), electric guitar (10)
 Chris Pelonis – guitar (9)
 Chris Kent – electric bass (5)
 Todd Smith – bass (9)
 Dan Needham – drums (1, 2, 3, 7, 8, 10), percussion (3)
 Yvette Preyer – drums (4, 5), tambourine (5)
 Chester Thompson – wave drum (8)
 Brian Zsupnik – drums (9)
 George Perilli – drums (11)
 Tom Roady – percussion (1, 7)
 Terry McMillan – percussion (4), congas (5)
 Danny Duncan – sound effects (8), percussion (10)
 Tim Akers – horn arrangements (1, 2, 7), string arrangements (1, 8), conductor (1), organ (4) 
 Mark Douthit – saxophone (1, 2, 7)
 Doug Moffet – saxophone (1, 2, 7)
 Denis Solee – saxophone (1, 2, 7)
 Barry Green – trombone (1)
 Mike Haynes – trumpet (1)
 Sam Levine – flute (6)
 Bobby Taylor – oboe (6)
 Viktor Krauss – bass fiddle (4)
 Ronn Huff – string arrangements and conductor (6)
 Carl Gorodetzky – concertmaster (1, 6), violin (8)
 The Nashville String Machine – strings (1, 6)
 Anthony LaMarchina – cello (1, 6)
 Bob Mason – cello (1, 6, 8)
 Carol McClure – harp (1, 6)
 Alan Umstead – viola (1, 6)
 Gary Vanosdale – viola (1, 6)
 Kris Wilkinson – viola (1, 6, 8)
 David Davidson – violin (1, 6)
 Conni Ellisor – violin (1, 6)
 Lee Larrison – violin (1, 6)
 Pamela Sixfin – violin (1, 6, 8)
 Mary Kathryn Vanosdale – violin (1, 6)
 Tabitha Fair – backing vocals (1)
 Angelo Petrucci – backing vocals (1)
 Veronica Petrucci – backing vocals (1)
 Nicol Smith – backing vocals (1, 8)
 Chris Willis – backing vocals (1)
 Wendy Moten – duet and backing vocals (2), vocal arrangements (2)
 Amy Holland – harmony vocals (4), backing vocals (7, 9)
 Rodney Covington – backing vocals (5), BGV arrangements(5)
 Stacy Covington – backing vocals (5)
 Delores Cox – backing vocals (5)
 Ladre Fayne – backing vocals (5)
 Pamela Holman – backing vocals (5)
 Alfreda McCrary – backing vocals (5)
 Tiffany Palmer – backing vocals (5)
 Demitria Slaydon – backing vocals (5)
 Duane Starling – backing vocals (5)
 Timothy Terry – backing vocals (5)
 Karla Bonoff – backing vocals (9)
 Christopher Cross – backing vocals (9)
 Claude McKnight – backing vocals (10)
 Joey Kibble – backing vocals (10)
 Mark Kibble – backing vocals (10)
 Kevin Max Smith – backing vocals (11)
 Toby McKeehan – duet and backing vocals (11)
 Michael Tait – backing vocals (11)

Production 
 Producers – Tommy Sims (Tracks 1, 2, 3, 6, 7, 8, 10 & 12); Bernie Chiaravalle (Tracks 4 & 5); Michael McDonald (Tracks 4, 5, 9 & 11); David Pack (Track 11).
 Production Coordination – Gail Chiaravalle,  Bridgett Evans O'Lannerghty and Susan Henson.
 Engineers – Mark Casselman, Ben Fowler, Andy Gerome, Jon Lechner, Russ Martin, Chris Pelonis, Greg Rubin, Grady Walker and Martin Woodlee.
 Assistant Engineers – Joe Costa, Tim Coyle, Dave Dillbeck, Mark Frigo, Tony Green, Graham Lewis, Shawn McLean, Hank Nirider and F. Reid Shippen.
 Mixing – Greg Rubin (Tracks 1, 7, 8, 10 & 12); Rick Will (Tracks 2–6 & 11); Chris Pelonis (Track 9).
 Hard Disk Editing on Tracks 4 & 5 – Shyene Guy
 Editing on Track 11 – Joe Houge
 Art Direction – Bruce Steinberg
 Design – Simon Design
 Photography – Gary Braasch (back cover), Dennis Keeley (front cover), Bruce Steinberg (inside) and Tony Stone Images.

References

2000 albums
Michael McDonald (musician) albums